L30 may refer to:
 60S ribosomal protein L30
 Albatros L 30, a German biplane
 , a destroyer of the Royal Navy
 Mitochondrial ribosomal protein L30
 Nissan Altima (L30), a Japanese American market-only automobile
 Royal Ordnance L30, a tank gun
 Toyota Tercel (L30), a Japanese automobile
 Zeppelin L 30, an airship of the Imperial German Navy